A National Landmark is a type of protected area in Canada. 

In the 1970s and 1980s, the Government of Canada envisioned establishing a system of National Landmarks in order to protect natural features considered to be "outstanding, exceptional, unique, or rare" in Canada. Such features would typically be isolated entities of scientific interest. 

Only one landmark has been established—Pingo Canadian Landmark—in the Northwest Territories. Another was proposed at the same time (1984)—Nelson Head Canadian Landmark—on the southern tip of Banks Island, also in the Northwest Territories. The legislation providing for the Landmark required a formal request be made by the Minister of the Environment within 10 years (until 1994). None was ever made.

See also
Protected areas of Canada
List of national parks of Canada

References

Protected areas of Canada